Eupithecia persimulata is a moth in the  family Geometridae. It is found in south-western Texas and Arizona.

The wingspan is about 18 mm. Adults have been recorded on wing in August.

References

Moths described in 1938
persimulata
Moths of North America